Rufus H. King (January 20, 1820 – September 13, 1890) was a U.S. Representative from New York.

Biography
Born in Rensselaerville, New York, King completed preparatory studies and was graduated from Wesleyan University. He studied law. He was admitted to the bar in 1843 and commenced practice in Catskill, New York.

King was elected as an Opposition Party candidate to the Thirty-fourth Congress (March 4, 1855 – March 3, 1857). He was not a candidate for renomination in 1856. He resumed the practice of law.

He served as president of the Catskill National Bank from 1865 to 1867. On the consolidation of that bank with the Tanners' National Bank, King continued on the board of directors. He served as presidential elector on the Republican ticket in 1860. He served as delegate to the Republican National Convention in 1868 and 1880.

He died in Catskill, New York, September 13, 1890. He was interred in Catskill Village Cemetery.

Sources

1820 births
1890 deaths
People from Rensselaerville, New York
Opposition Party members of the United States House of Representatives from New York (state)
New York (state) Republicans
1860 United States presidential electors
Wesleyan University alumni
19th-century American politicians